Massimo Fabbrizi (born 27 August 1977 in San Benedetto del Tronto, Italy) is an Italian professional target shooter. He competed in the trap event at the 2012 Summer Olympics where he won the silver medal.

Fabbrizi is an athlete of the Centro Sportivo Carabinieri.

Biography
Before the 2012 Olympics, Fabbrizi was the World champion in trap shooting.

References

External links
 

1977 births
Living people
Italian male sport shooters
Olympic shooters of Italy
Shooters at the 2012 Summer Olympics
Shooters at the 2016 Summer Olympics
Olympic silver medalists for Italy
Olympic medalists in shooting
Medalists at the 2012 Summer Olympics
European Games competitors for Italy
Shooters at the 2015 European Games
Mediterranean Games silver medalists for Italy
Mediterranean Games medalists in shooting
Competitors at the 2013 Mediterranean Games
Shooters of Centro Sportivo Carabinieri
21st-century Italian people